Ropica quadricristata is a species of beetle in the family Cerambycidae. It was described by Breuning in 1939. It is known from Malaysia.

References

quadricristata
Beetles described in 1939